CCAAT/enhancer-binding protein gamma (C/EBPγ) is a protein that in humans is encoded by the CEBPG gene. This gene has no introns.

The C/EBP family of transcription factors regulates viral and cellular CCAAT/enhancer element-mediated transcription.  C/EBP proteins  contain the bZIP region, which is characterized by two motifs in the C-terminal half of the protein: a basic region involved in DNA binding and a leucine zipper motif involved in dimerization. The C/EBP family consist of several related proteins, C/EBPα, C/EBPβ, C/EBPγ, C/EBPδ, C/EBPζ, and C/EBPε, that form homodimers and that form heterodimers with each other.  CCAAT/enhancer binding protein gamma may cooperate with Fos to bind the positive regulatory element-I (PRE-I) enhancer elements.

C/EBPγ forms heterodimer with ATF4 for transcriptional activation of target genes in autophagy specifically to amino acid starvation.

C/EBPγ along with its regulator, the trauma-induced transcription factor EGR1, plays an important role in the development of chronic pain and mechanical hypersensitivity after some types of injury or surgery.

References

Further reading

External links 
 
 

Transcription factors